James "Jim" Grant (born 26 July 1946) is an American writer and publisher. He founded Grant's Interest Rate Observer, a twice-monthly journal of the financial markets published since 1983. He has also written several books on finance and history.

Personal life
Grant served as a Navy Gunner's mate, graduated from Indiana University, and received a master's degree in International relations from Columbia University.

He is married to Patricia Kavanagh, M.D., a neurologist, and lives in Brooklyn Heights, Brooklyn. They have four children.

Journalism
He began his journalistic career at the Baltimore Sun in 1972 and joined the staff of Barron's in 1975. He founded Grant's in 1983. Success was slow. "A critic complained that Money of the Mind, my ... history of American finance, was like an account of the interstate highway system written from the point of view of the accidents", Grant wrote in Minding Mr. Market (1993). "The same might be said, both fairly and unfairly, of Grant's. Where most observers of the 1980s emphasized the rewards, we dwelled mainly on the risks. In the junk bond, in the reckless patterns of bank lending, in the dementia of Japanese finance, in the riot of the Treasury's borrowing, we saw not the bull markets of today but the comeuppance of tomorrow." 
   
However, the publication's signature skepticism served it, and its readers, better in the 2000s. Mr. Market Miscalculates (2008), a collection of Grant's articles published over the preceding 10 years, elicited an appreciative review in the Financial Times. John Authers wrote of the staff of the FT: "If Grant could see what was happening this clearly ... and warn of it in a well-circulated publication, how did the world's financial regulators fail to avert the crisis before it became deadly, and how did the rest of us continue to make the irrational investing decisions that make Mr. Market behave the way he does?"

Grant received the 2015 Gerald Loeb Lifetime Achievement Award for excellence in business journalism.

Books
Grant is the author of Money of the Mind (1992), The Trouble with Prosperity (1996), John Adams: Party of One (2005), Mr. Speaker: The Life and Times of Thomas B. Reed, the Man Who Broke the Filibuster (2011), and The Forgotten Depression (2014) among other works. 

His most recent publication is Bagehot: The Life and Times of the Greatest Victorian (2019), a biography of Walter Bagehot, the influential English banker, economic and political writer, and editor of the Economist, whose ideas about central banking informed the U.S. Federal Reserve's response to the global financial crisis of 2007–2009.

2012 election
During Representative Ron Paul's 2012 U.S. Presidential campaign, he named Grant as his likely candidate for Chairman of the Federal Reserve to replace Ben Bernanke whose term expired in 2014.

Bibliography
1983: Bernard M. Baruch: The Adventures of a Wall Street Legend, 1997 paperback edition
1992: Money of the Mind, 1994 paperback edition
1993: Minding Mr. Market, 2000 paperback edition
1996: The Trouble with Prosperity: A Contrarian's Tale of Boom, Bust, and Speculation
2005: John Adams: Party of One, paperback edition 
2008: Mr. Market Miscalculates: The Bubble Years and Beyond
2011: Mr. Speaker!: The Life and Times of Thomas B. Reed, the Man Who Broke the Filibuster, 2012 paperback edition
2014: The Forgotten Depression
2019: Bagehot: The Life and Times of the Greatest Victorian

See also
Everything bubble

References

External links
 Grant's Interest Rate Observer website
James Grant interviewed by GoldMoney Foundation

C-SPAN Q&A interview with Grant about Mr. Speaker! The Life and Times of Thomas B. Reed, The Man Who Broke the Filibuster, June 5, 2011

American biographers
American male biographers
American financial writers
Columbia University alumni
Indiana University alumni
Living people
1946 births
Gerald Loeb Lifetime Achievement Award winners
United States Navy sailors